The Telstra Endeavour is a submarine cable connecting Sydney and Hawaii. The cable went live in October 2008, with a capacity of 1.28 terabits per second in the future (currently at 80 gigabits per second.) It was proposed on 28 March 2007 by Telstra, the largest telecommunications carrier in Australia.

Landing points
The landing points are:
 Tamarama Beach, Sydney, Australia, with termination at Paddington
 Keawaula, Waianae, Hawaii

History
Telstra announced that the cable would connect Sydney and Hawaii with a 9,000 km link, the largest ever built and owned by an Australian company, providing a transmission capacity of 1.28 terabit/s to Hawaii. The cable will be linked to others from Hawaii to the US mainland.

The manufacture and laying of the cable was the responsibility of Alcatel-Lucent, which also supplied Telstra's two cables across Bass Strait and its Tasman Sea (Tasman 2) cable. Alcatel-Lucent is basing this turn-key project on the "Alcatel 1620 Light Manager" submarine line termination equipment that uses dense wavelength-division multiplexing (DWDM). No cost was revealed, however it is estimated around $300 million (AUD).

See also
 Other Australian international submarine cables (and year of first service):
 Pipe Pacific Cable (2009)
 Australia-Japan Cable (2001)
 Southern Cross Cable (2000)
 SEA-ME-WE 3 (2000, Australian portion in service earlier)
 JASURAUS (1997)
 PacRimWest (1995)

References

Infrastructure completed in 2008
Submarine communications cables in the Pacific Ocean
Telstra
Australia–United States relations
2008 establishments in Australia
2008 establishments in Hawaii